The Marib-Jawf gas field is a natural gas field located onshore the Al Jawf Governorate. It was discovered in 2000 and developed by Total S.A. It began production in 2005 and produces natural gas and condensates. The total proven reserves of the Marib-Jawf gas field are around 10 trillion cubic feet (286 km³), and production is slated to be around 1.2 billion cubic feet/day (34.2×105m³).

References

Natural gas fields in Yemen